The Fire Sprinkler Incentive Act (FSIA) is the name of a piece of legislation that has been introduced in both the House and the Senate since 2003. The legislation would amend the 1986 Internal Revenue Code by classifying fire sprinkler retrofits as either a Section 179 depreciation deduction or a fifteen-year property for purposes of depreciation. Currently the tax depreciation time for commercial property is 39 years and 27.5 for residential.

The FSIA would allow for a more rapid recovery of cost, and would reduce the annual economic and human losses that fire in the U.S. inflicts on the national economy, environment, and quality of life. Passage of the FSIA would be consistent with past practice at the federal level, where Congress has historically provided incentives and left decisions regarding adoption of fire protection requirements up to state and local government.

Background
After the Station nightclub fire killed 100 concertgoers in Rhode Island in February 2003, many lawmakers took note of the need to update building and fire codes, but no national action was taken. A large coalition (including firefighter associations, labor organizations, fire sprinkler manufacturers and fire and life organizations) has since formed to lobby congress to pass the FSIA.

The FSIA was first introduced in the House of Representatives by Rep. Curt Weldon [R-PA] in 2003 and in the Senate by Sen. Rick Santorum [R-PA] in 2004. The legislation has been introduced in both chambers in every Congress since the 108th session, but has never made it out of committee.

The 111th Congress was thought to be more successful with regards to the FSIA’s passage by focusing on the immediate needs of the country, including unemployment. Passage of the FSIA would mean an increase in employment among small businesses that offer sprinkler installation services.

The biggest present obstacle to passing the FSIA is the expected cost.

Effect
According to the National Fire Protection Association (NFPA), there are more than 16,000 fire-related injuries, 3,200 civilian deaths, and 100 firefighter deaths each year. A 2007 NFPA study found that in buildings with properly installed sprinklers, the death rate per fire can be reduced by 83 percent and property damage decreased by 69 percent. The NFPA also has no record of two or more deaths in an educational, institutional, public assembly or residential building with properly installed and functioning sprinkler systems.

The direct property damage caused by fire is more than $10 billion annually in the U.S., rising to $107 billion when accounting for indirect costs such as lost economic activity. The total cost due to fire in America reaches $347 billion when including human losses, economic losses, and the cost of provisions to prevent the cost of fire.

Despite these touted benefits; despite support from firefighters, fire sprinkler manufacturers, and fire and life safety groups; and despite widespread nominal support from members of Congress, the bill has yet to become law, even though it has been introduced in every Congress since 2003. Gregory Cade, director of government affairs for the National Fallen Firefighters Foundation, said in an interview that the bill faces two main political obstacles. The first is the loss of revenue for the Treasury, which would increase the budget deficit unless other taxes are raised or expenses curtailed, and no agreement has been reached on the means to achieve that balance. Second, the fact that the bill would amend the tax code tends to open up the wider debates around the comprehensive restructuring of the tax code as a whole, which has been a contentious area of debate.

Legislative history

Coalition support
The Fire Sprinkler Incentive Act has been endorsed and supported by the following organizations:
American Fire Sprinkler Association
American Health Care Association
American Hotel and Lodging Association
American Institute of Architects
American Insurance Association
American Society of Safety Engineers
Building Owners and Managers Association
Congressional Fire Services Institute
Fire Department Safety Officers Association
Home Safety Council
Independent Insurance Agents & Brokers of America
International Association of Arson Investigators
International Association of Black Professional Firefighters
International Association of Fire Chiefs
International Association of Fire Fighters
International Code Council
International Fire Marshals Association
International Fire Service Training Association
International Society of Fire Service Instructors
Mechanical Contractors Association
National Association of Elected Fire Officials
National Association of State Fire Marshals
National Fallen Firefighters Foundation
National Fire Protection Association
National Fire Sprinkler Association
National Society of Executive Fire Officers
National Volunteer Fire Council
North American Fire Training Directors
SimplexGrinnell
Society of Fire Protection Engineers
The Associated General Contractors of America
The Committee on Pipe and Tube Imports
The Lightning Safety Alliance
Underwriters Laboratories
 United Association of Journeymen and Apprentices of the Plumbing and Pipe Fitting Industry
USA Sprinkler Fitters Association

References

External links
Text of H.R. 1194
, Roll Call, May 27, 2010:Nightclub Inferno Sparked an Industry’s Push

Proposed legislation of the 108th United States Congress
Proposed legislation of the 109th United States Congress
Proposed legislation of the 110th United States Congress
Proposed legislation of the 111th United States Congress
Proposed legislation of the 112th United States Congress
Proposed legislation of the 113th United States Congress